William Roberts  was a Welsh priest in the 16th Century.

Newcombe was born in Castellmarch and educated at the University of Oxford.   He held incumbencies at Shrivenham, Ruthin and Llandudno. He held Livings at Caerwys, Llanfachraeth, Festiniog, Llanddeniolen-juxta-Bangor, Llanfihangel-y-traethau and  Llanbedroc-in-Llyn.

He was Archdeacon of Merioneth from 1524 until his death in 1561

References

People from Caernarfonshire
1561 deaths
Archdeacons of Merioneth
Alumni of the University of Oxford